Mladost Stadium may refer to:

Mladost Stadium (Kruševac), a stadium in Kruševac, Serbia
Mladost Stadium (Lučani), a stadium in Lučani, Serbia
Stadion Mladost, Strumica, a stadium in Strumica, Macedonia
Stadion SRC Mladost, Čakovec, a stadium in Čakovec, Croatia
Sportski Park Mladost, a HAŠK Mladost athletic stadium in Zagreb, Croatia